Anchalee Vivatanachai (born 1952), writing under the pen name Anchan, is a Thai writer living in the United States. She was a recipient of the S.E.A. Write Award.

Biography
She was born in Thonburi and received a BA in Thai language and literature from Chulalongkorn University. After graduating, she went to live in New York City with her parents. She met her husband there. She studied gemology at the Gemological Institute of America and worked for a jewelry company in New York City.

Anchan published her first story "Mother Dear" which, in 1985, was named the best short story of the year by the Thai PEN Center. Her short story collection Anmanī hāēng chīwit  (Jewels of Life) received the Southeast Asian Write Award in 1990. A collection of poems Lāisư̄ (The Letters) was shortlisted for a Southeast Asian Write Award in 1995.

References 

Thai poets
1953 births
Living people
Thai women short story writers
Thai women poets
Pseudonymous women writers
Chulalongkorn University alumni
20th-century poets
20th-century Thai writers
21st-century Thai writers
20th-century Thai women writers
21st-century Thai women writers
20th-century pseudonymous writers
21st-century pseudonymous writers